Big Happiness is a lost 1920 American silent drama film directed by Colin Campbell and starring Dustin Farnum. It was produced by Dustin Farnum and distributed through Robertson-Cole Distributing Corporation.

Cast
Dustin Farnum as John Dant / James Dant
Kathryn Adams as June Dant
Fred Malatesta as Raoul de Bergerac
Violet Scram as Mlle DeFarge
Joseph J. Dowling as Alick Crayshaw
William H. Brown as Watson
Aggie Herring as Concierza

References

External links

1920 films
American silent feature films
Lost American films
Films directed by Colin Campbell
Film Booking Offices of America films
American black-and-white films
Silent American drama films
1920 drama films
1920 lost films
Lost drama films
1920s American films